Toral may refer to:

Toral (given name)
Toral (surname)
Toral (Star Trek), a fictional character in Star Trek
Operation Toral, the codename for British presence within Afghanistan post-2014
Toral Lie algebra
Surrender of General Toral, an 1898 film
Toral de los Guzmanes, a municipality in Spain
Toral de los Vados, a municipality in Spain